Buena Vista is an unincorporated community in Scioto County, in the U.S. state of Ohio.

History
Buena Vista was platted in 1850. The community was named in commemoration of the Battle of Buena Vista (1847) in the Mexican–American War. A post office called Buena Vista was established in 1883, and remained in operation until 1960.

References

Unincorporated communities in Scioto County, Ohio
Unincorporated communities in Ohio